Aleksandar Ratkov (born 11 March 1992) is a Serbian 3x3 basketball player for Liman 3x3 of the FIBA 3x3 World Tour. Also, he represents the Serbian national team internationally.

3x3 career 
Ratkov has been a member of Novi Sad-based Liman 3x3 team since it formation in 2015. He co-founded the team with Stefan Stojačić at the University of Novi Sad Faculty of Technical Sciences. In 2017, the team has its first professional season.

National 3x3 team career 
Ratkov represents Serbian 3x3 national team internationally. He made his debut at the 2020 Summer Olympics.

References

External links 
 Aleksandar Ratkov at liman3x3.com
 Aleksandar Ratkov at Eurobasket
 

1992 births
Living people
3x3 basketball players at the 2020 Summer Olympics
Basketball players from Belgrade
Forwards (basketball)
Medalists at the 2020 Summer Olympics
Olympic 3x3 basketball players of Serbia
Olympic bronze medalists for Serbia
Olympic medalists in 3x3 basketball
Serbian men's basketball players
Serbian men's 3x3 basketball players
KK Vojvodina players
University of Novi Sad alumni